Anthony Ulrich (28 August 1714, Bevern – 4 May 1774 (O.S.), Kholmogory), Duke of Brunswick-Lüneburg, was Generalissimo of the Army of Russia, and the husband of Anna Leopoldovna, who reigned as regent of Russia for one year.

Biography 

Anthony Ulrich was the second son of Ferdinand Albert II, Duke of Brunswick-Lüneburg and Princess Antoinette of Brunswick-Wolfenbüttel. His mother's sister, Elizabeth, wife of Charles VI, Holy Roman Emperor, arranged for his marriage to HSH Duchess Elisabeth of Mecklenburg-Schwerin (known as "Anna Leopoldovna"), daughter of Charles Leopold, Duke of Mecklenburg-Schwerin, and granddaughter of Tsar Ivan V; and he was taken to Russia in 1733, so that he and Anna could get to know each other. The marriage took place in 1739. This marriage was intended to strengthen the relationships between the houses of Romanov and Habsburg. In 1740, their infant son, Ivan, became emperor as Ivan VI. Initially, Duke Ernst Biron of Kurland was regent, but when rumors surfaced that Biron planned on exiling Anthony and Anna to Germany, they staged a coup and Anna was named regent. Not long after, a coup in 1741 removed the family from power.

The new Empress, Elizabeth, had Anthony Ulrich, his wife, and their children imprisoned. They remained so for the rest of their lives. The years of imprisonment were hard, and the family was periodically denied many necessary things. Virtually all communication with the outside world, with the exception of a few servants, was banned. The governor of Arkhangelsk regularly visited them to enquire about their health. 

In 1762, Elizabeth died, and the new Empress Catherine offered the Duke permission to leave Russia, with the condition he leave his children behind; but he declined. He lost his eyesight before he died. He was buried very discreetly, and the soldiers were forbidden to reveal the place of his burial, but his coffin was decorated with silver.

In 1780, the surviving children were released from prison into the custody of their aunt, the Danish queen dowager Juliana Maria of Brunswick-Wolfenbüttel. They were taken to Novodvinsk fortress the night of 27 June and left Russia on 30 June. They settled in Jutland, where they lived in under a comfortable house arrest in Horsens for the rest of their lives, under the guardianship of Juliana and at the expense of Catherine. Having lived as prisoners, they were not used to social life, and kept a small "court" of 40/50 people, all Danish except for the priest. The pension granted them by Catherine was paid until the last of them died in 1807.

Family
Anthony Ulrich and Anna Leopoldovna had the following children:
 Ivan VI (1740–1764) (reigning Emperor 1740–1741)
 Catherine Antonovna of Brunswick (1741–1807) (released to house arrest in Horsens in Denmark in 1780)
 Elizabeth Antonovna of Brunswick (1743–1782) (released to house arrest in Horsens in Denmark in 1780)
 Peter Antonovich of Brunswick (1745–1798) (released to house arrest in Horsens in Denmark in 1780)
 Alexei Antonovich of Brunswick (1746–1787) (released to house arrest in Horsens in Denmark in 1780)

Ancestry

References

 At the House of Welf site (in German)
 Marie Tetzlaff : Katarina den stora (1998)

1714 births
1774 deaths
People from Holzminden (district)
House of Mecklenburg-Brunswick-Romanov
Generalissimos
Imperial Russian Army generals
18th-century military personnel from the Russian Empire
Sons of monarchs